Linnaea yunnanensis, synonym Dipelta yunnanensis, is a species of deciduous shrub belonging to the honeysuckle family Caprifoliaceae. They are native to Yunnan, China.

References

External links
 
 

Flora of China
Caprifoliaceae
Plants described in 1891